Granoturris is a genus of sea snails, marine gastropod mollusks in the family Mangeliidae.

Species
Species within the genus Granoturris include:
 Granoturris padolina Fargo, 1953
 Granoturris presleyi Lyons, 1972
 Species brought into synonymy
 Granoturris rhysa (Watson, R.B., 1881): synonym of  Kurtziella rhysa (Watson, 1881)

References

 Fargo, W. G. "Part II. The Pliocene Turridae of Saint Petersburg, Florida." Academy of Natural Sciences of Philadelphia, Monograph 8 (1953): 361-409.

External links
 Todd, Jonathan A. "Systematic list of gastropods in the Panama Paleontology Project collections." Budd and Foster 2006 (1996)
  Bouchet P., Kantor Yu.I., Sysoev A. & Puillandre N. (2011) A new operational classification of the Conoidea. Journal of Molluscan Studies 77: 273-308.
 Worldwide Mollusc Species Data Base: Mangeliidae
  Tucker, J.K. 2004 Catalog of recent and fossil turrids (Mollusca: Gastropoda). Zootaxa 682:1-1295.
  Todd, Jonathan A. "Systematic list of gastropods in the Panama Paleontology Project collections." Budd and Foster 2006 (1996).